Warren Seitz (born September 29, 1962) is a former American football tight end and wide receiver. He played for the Pittsburgh Steelers in 1986 and for the New York Giants in 1987.

References

1962 births
Living people
American football tight ends
American football wide receivers
Missouri Tigers football players
Pittsburgh Steelers players
New York Giants players